The Monument to the Shoemaker is a public sculpture in Novo Hamburgo, southern Brazil. It was designed by the artist Flávio Scholles in homage to the workers of shoe factories in Novo Hamburgo, and was inaugurated on 1 May 1979. The sculpture is located on a roundabout at the junction of Av. Nações Unidas and Av. Nicolau Becker.

The six vertical elements represent the six days the workers worked each week, under an eight-hour clock, representing eight hours a day working on the production lines.

References 

Novo Hamburgo
Buildings and structures in Rio Grande do Sul
Monuments and memorials in Brazil
Tourist attractions in Rio Grande do Sul
1979 sculptures